The sixth season of the animated television series, Aqua Teen Hunger Force originally aired in the United States on Cartoon Network's late night programming block, Adult Swim. Season six started on March 29, 2009, with "Gene E" and ended with "Last Last One Forever and Ever" on May 31, 2009, with a total of ten episodes. Aqua Teen Hunger Force is about the surreal adventures and antics of three anthropomorphic fast food items: Master Shake, Frylock, and Meatwad, who live together as roommates and frequently interact with their human next-door neighbor, Carl Brutananadilewski in a suburban neighborhood in South New Jersey. In May 2015, this season became available on Hulu Plus.

The season six finale, "Last Last One Forever and Ever", was made as a special "live action" episode. The episode features David Long Jr., who had won a contest through Burger King in order to perform the role of a live action Carl. Episodes in season six were written and directed by Dave Willis and Matt Maiellaro. Almost every episode in this season features a special guest appearance, which continues a practice used in past seasons.

This season has been made available on DVD, and other forms of home media, including on demand streaming.

The episode, "Shake Like Me", was removed from HBO Max in June 2020 and Aqua Teen Hunger Force: The Baffler Meal Complete Collection DVD for "cultural sensitivities."

Production
Every episode in this season was written and directed by series creators Dave Willis and Matt Maiellaro, who have both written and directed every episode of the series. All episodes originally aired in the United States on Cartoon Network's late night programming block, Adult Swim. This season was one of the original seasons branded under the Aqua Teen Hunger Force title before Willis and Maiellaro started using a different alternative title for each season in 2011.

Cast

In season six the main cast consisted of Dana Snyder who provided the voice of Master Shake, Carey Means who provided the voice of Frylock, and series co-creator Dave Willis who provided the voice of both Meatwad and Carl Brutananadilewski; and recurring character Ignignokt.  Season six also featured appearances from recurring voice cast members such as C. Martin Croker who voiced Dr. Weird in "Last Last One Forever and Ever", Matt Maiellaro who voiced Err, George Lowe who voiced himself as various characters, and Brendon Small voiced Dr. Wongburger.

Season six features guest many appearances. In "She Creature" Dana Swanson voices She Creature, Vincent Pastore voiced Terry, Steve Schirripa voiced Terry's assistant, In "Creature from Plague Lagoon", Tommy Blacha voiced Gary the Dairy Fairy, and Jon Schnepp voiced the real Creature from Plaque Lagoon. Scott Adsit voiced  Drewbecca and Scott Fry as the Pawn Store Clerk in "2-And-a-Half-Star Wars Out of Five", Bill Hader voiced a balloon version of Adolf Hitler in "Der Inflatable Fuhrer". In "Last Last One Forever and Ever" H. Jon Benjamin played a live action version of Master Shake named Don Shake, T-Pain played a live-action version of Frylock, David Long, Jr. played a live action version of Carl Brutananadilewski, and Drake E. Stephens played an unnamed child. Long was selected after a casting call that started at the 2008 San Diego Comic-Con International.

Episodes

Reception
Jonah Krakow of IGN gave "The Creature from Plaque Lagoon" a 7 out of 10, which is considered "Good", calling the episode "straight forward" and comparing it to the season four episode "Dickesode". Kraków gave "Time Machine" a negative score of 6.7, as well as a negative review, saying Master Shake's "Safety Fart" song was the only amusing part of the episode. "2-And-a-Half-Star Wars Out of Five" aka ("Pink Man") was given a 7.5 by Kraków, found several jokes throughout the episode amusing, but found the scene with Carl throwing batteries at Drew funny, he also stated "ATHF is all about the journey, not the destination". Kraków found Frylock's actions in "Fry Legs", a little strange and out-of-character for Frylock, who usually seen as the voice of reason. Kraków also found parts of "Fry Legs" humorous saying "yet another enjoyable episode that delivered its share of laughs, awkwardness and bloody chunks of flesh", and giving the episode a 7.9. Kraków found "Der Inflatable Fuhrer", easy to follow and was surprised with the direction the episode went in saying "The jokes were funny, the ideas were fresh and the outcome was predictable, but fulfilling nonetheless", and giving it an 8.2. Kraków gave "Last Last One Forever and Ever" ("Live Action") a score of 6.0, and a negative review, calling it "over-hyped" and saying "the show lost focus and failed to deliver the one thing that has kept it going for six seasons: jokes".

Home release

The first four episodes from season six were released on the Aqua Teen Hunger Force Volume Six DVD on December 16, 2008, months prior to their official television debuts, along with nine episodes from season five. The remaining six episodes were released on the Aqua Teen Hunger Force Volume Seven June 1, 2010, along with five episodes from season seven. Both sets were distributed by Adult Swim and Warner Home Video and feature various special features, including behind the scenes on "Last Last One Forever and Ever" on the Volume Seven set. The Volume Seven DVD marks the first time episodes were released on DVD with completely uncensored dialogue. Both sets were later released in Region 4 by Madman Entertainment on February 10, 2010 and June 16, 2010 respectively.

This season was also released under the label "Season 7" in HD and SD on iTunes, the Xbox Live Marketplace, and Amazon Video under the label "Volume 7".

In 2020, Cartoon Network and Adult Swim pulled the episode "Shake Like Me" from their rerun rotation and streaming services, whose plot was described as an "animated equivalent of blackface", due to cultural sensitivities. However, the episode is still available on the Volume Six DVD.

See also
 "Last Last One Forever and Ever"
 List of Aqua Teen Hunger Force episodes
 Aqua Teen Hunger Force

References

External links

 Aqua Teen Hunger Force at Adult Swim
 Aqua Teen Hunger Force season 6 at the Internet Movie Database

2009 American television seasons
Aqua Teen Hunger Force seasons